"Used for Glue" is a song by American post-hardcore band Rival Schools. The song was released as the first single from the band's debut album United by Fate. The song peaked at no. 42 on the UK Singles Chart in late March 2002.

Music video
A music video was released for the song and shows the band performing the song at a house party. The main narrative of the video focuses on two party goers who become romantically interested in one another.

Track listing
CD single

Enhanced CD single

7" single

Charts

Personnel
Walter Schreifels – lead vocals, guitar
Ian Love – guitar, backing vocals
Cache Tolman – bass
Sammy Siegler – drums

References

2001 songs
2002 debut singles
Island Records singles